Passang Tshering (born 16 July 1983) is a Bhutanese former professional footballer and coach. Passang played as a forward for Transport United, Druk Star and Thimphu City. He was also a member of Bhutan national futsal team.

In 2007, he won the title of A-Division top-scorer. On 4 August 2007, Passang Tshering could go down in the history of football for three reasons: scoring a hat-trick within three minutes, scoring nine goals in the second half (45 minutes), and scoring the most goals in a single game, 17.  “I didn’t expect to score 17", Passang Tshering told Kuensel. "But there is no reason to celebrate or feel great because we played against a weak team.” Asked if Passang Tshering's record would be recognised, coordinator Dinesh Chhetri said that it was just a national league and would be difficult for regional or international football governing to recognize it. “Besides his team mates planned him to score the goals to make him the highest goal scorer”, said Dinesh.

Passang is also a member of the Bhutanese national team.

Career statistics

International goals

References

External links
 

1983 births
Living people
Association football midfielders
Association football forwards
Bhutanese footballers
Bhutan international footballers
Transport United F.C. players
People from Thimphu